St. Paul Baptist Church is a historic African-American Baptist church located at Lloyd St and Edmondson Avenue in Tarboro, Edgecombe County, North Carolina. The church was built in 1871, and is a one-story, irregularly massed frame building with multiple gabled wings, and a corner tower.  It is sheathed in weatherboard with abundant wooden decoration. The interior features a large open sanctuary with a dome and oculus above.  It was moved from its original Main Street site to the present location about  1926.

It was listed on the National Register of Historic Places in 1980.

References

African-American history of North Carolina
Baptist churches in North Carolina
Churches in Tarboro, North Carolina
Churches on the National Register of Historic Places in North Carolina
Churches completed in 1871
19th-century Baptist churches in the United States
National Register of Historic Places in Edgecombe County, North Carolina